Frank Stokes (7 June 1881 – 1945) was an English professional footballer who played as a full back. He made more than 250 appearances in the Football League playing for Burslem Port Vale and Small Heath / Birmingham between 1898 and 1910. In between these two spells he spent 1901 to 1903 at Reading, and helped the club to finish second in the Southern League in the 1902–03 season. He played in several England trials but was never selected.

Career

Burslem Port Vale
Stokes was born in Burslem, Staffordshire. He joined Burslem Port Vale from local side Burslem Park in October 1898. He made his debut on 4 March 1899 in a 4–1 win over Luton Town at the Athletic Ground, and went on to play a further two Second Division games in the 1898–99 season. He became a first team regular in the 1899–1900 campaign, featuring in 32 league and 10 cup games and missing just two league games all season long, he played more matches than any other Vale player. In the 1900–01 season he again played 32 league games, with just two absences across the whole of the season. He signed for Southern League club Reading in the summer of 1901.

Reading
The "Royals" posted a fifth-place finish in 1901–02, before finishing as runners-up to Southampton in 1902–03. He then left Elm Park and returned to the Midlands and the Football League in 1903 to sign for Small Heath (later renamed Birmingham). The Daily Express reported that

Small Heath
A muscular yet mobile defender, he formed an excellent full-back pairing with Jack Glover. He went straight into the first team,  and played 26 First Division and four FA Cup games in 1903–04. He was an ever-present in the 35 game 1904–05 season, and featured 37 times in the 1905–06 campaign; the club changed its name to Birmingham F.C. in 1905. He played 38 of the club's 39 games in the 1906–07 season, and scored his first goal at Coventry Road on 6 October, in a 2–0 win over Notts County. In the 1907–08 relegation season, the first full season to be played at St Andrew's, he made 29 appearances. He featured in 23 Second Division games in the 1908–09 season and played 21 times in the 1909–10 campaign. In his seven years at the club he made 213 appearances in all competitions, before a serious knee injury forced his retirement.

Career statistics
Source:

Notes

References

1881 births
1945 deaths
Sportspeople from Burslem
English footballers
Association football fullbacks
Port Vale F.C. players
Reading F.C. players
Birmingham City F.C. players
Worcester City F.C. players
English Football League players
Southern Football League players
Date of death missing
Place of death missing